On 22 January 2021, 19 corpses were found at Camargo Municipality, Tamaulipas, Mexico.

Background
The Mexican drug war is an asymmetric low-intensity conflict between drug cartels and the government, and between rival cartels. It began in 2006, is part of the global war on drugs and is concentrated in the country's northern states. In Tamaulipas, this includes massacres in San Fernando in 2010 and 2011 and in Miguel Alemán Municipality in 2019. Violent organized crime groups are very active in the area in which the corpses were found, including clashes between the Noreste and Gulf Cartels.

Massacre
On 22 January 2021, 19 corpses were found in a truck in Camargo Municipality, which is in the Mexican state Tamaulipas and borders Texas in the United States. The authorities discovered two vehicles which were on fire. In a pickup truck which had 113 bullet impacts, 19 people were found dead, having been shot and burned. They were migrants - 16 Guatemalans, 2 Mexicans and the other of unidentified nationality - who were intending to cross the international border. Five migrants survived.

Reaction

In early February 2021, a dozen police officers were arrested in connection to the massacre.

References
 

2021 fires in North America
2021 mass shootings in Mexico
2021 murders in Mexico
21st century in Tamaulipas
21st-century mass murder in Mexico
Crime in Tamaulipas
Fires in Mexico
January 2021 crimes in North America
January 2021 events in Mexico
Massacres in 2021
Massacres in Mexico
Battles of the Mexican drug war